Muhammad Ali, Prince of the Sa'id (born 5 February 1979) is the heir apparent to the defunct thrones of Egypt and the Sudan, as the elder son of the former king, Fuad II.

Life and family

Muhammad Ali was born on 5 February 1979 in Cairo, Egypt. He is the elder son of Fuad II, who was deposed while he was still a baby and was raised in exile, and his former wife, (née Dominique-France Loeb-Picard). Muhammad Ali is also the grandson of King Farouk and Queen Narriman.

At the request of his father, Fuad II, he received special permission from President Anwar Sadat for his mother, Fadila, to give birth in Egypt. As a result, Muhammad Ali became the first member of the direct branch of the Royal Family of Egypt to return to the country after the coup of 1953. 

Prince Muhammad Ali was raised and educated between Europe and Morocco, attending Institut Le Rosey in Switzerland. He works in real estate in Paris.

He is also spending time in Egypt, particularly since the Egyptian state recognizes the historical heritage of the Muhammad Ali dynasty.

Mohamed Ali has a sister, Fawzia Latifa, born in Monaco on February 12, 1982, and a brother, Fakhr-Eddin, born in Rabat, Morocco on August 25, 1987.

Marriage and issue
While on holiday in Istanbul, Prince Muhammad Ali attended the wedding of Prince Rudolf of Liechtenstein and Tılsım Tanberk on April 20, 2012. There, he met Princess Noal of Afghanistan, daughter of Prince Muhammed Daoud Pashtunyar Khan and granddaughter of King Zahir Shah of Afghanistan. The couple's betrothal was announced on April 27, 2013.

Their wedding was held on 30 August, 2013, at Istanbul's former Çırağan Palace, in the presence of Fuad II. Members of both families and their friends attended the wedding and festivities, and representatives from European and Middle Eastern royal families as well as many Egyptian dignitaries were also invited.

From this union, two children were born on the 12th of January, 2017, twins, who bear the title of Royal Highness:
 Fouad Zaher Hassan, Prince of Egypt. His names were chosen in honor of his grandfather, King Fouad II of Egypt, his great-grandfather, King Zaher Shah of Afghanistan, and King Hassan II of Morocco.
 Farah-Noor, Princess of Egypt.

Titles and styles
5 February 1979 – present:  His Royal Highness Prince Muhammad Ali of Egypt, Prince of the Sa’id (title of pretense and by courtesy).

Dynastic honours 
  Housse of Muhammad Ali: Collar of the Order of Muhammad Ali.

Ancestry

References 

|-

Muhammad Ali dynasty
1979 births
Living people
Egyptian emigrants to France
Egyptian people of Greek descent
Egyptian people of French descent
Egyptian people of Albanian descent
Egyptian people of Turkish descent
Egyptian people of Circassian descent
Egyptian people of Jewish descent
Sons of kings
Alumni of Institut Le Rosey